Ralf Männil (24 October 1924 Tallinn – 27 September 1990 Tallinn) was an Estonian geologist.

He has described the following taxa: 
 bryozoan Sardesonina carinata (Männil, 1958) 
 bryozoan Oanduella bassleri Männil, 1958 
 echinoderm Bothriocidaris eichwaldi Männil, 1962

His brother was Estonian entrepreneur Harry Männil.

References

1924 births
1990 deaths
Estonian geologists